U.S. Route 81 has eight special routes. Three are in Texas, one in Oklahoma, two in Kansas, and two in North Dakota.

Texas
There are officially three business routes of US 81 designated by the Texas Department of Transportation (TxDOT). Additional former alignments of US 81 are designated as state highway loops and state highway spurs, while others became business routes of Interstate 35 (I-35) after US 81 was eliminated south of Fort Worth in 1991.

San Antonio

Loop 353 is the former routing of US 81 in southern San Antonio, formed in 1961 when US 81 was rerouted onto the I-35 freeway to the east. It was originally marked as a business route of US 81.

Loop 368 is the former routing of US 81 in northern San Antonio, formed in 1962 when US 81 was rerouted onto the I-35 freeway to the east. It was originally marked as a business route of US 81.

Rhome

Business U.S. Highway 81-E (Bus. US 81-E) is the former route of US 81 and US 287 through Rhome. The route was originally designated as Loop 506 on May 31, 1972, and signed as a business route of US 81 and US 287; the portion south of its intersection with Spur 440 (numbered the same day as a redesignation of SH 114 through Rhome) was also signed as a business route of SH 114. Loop 506 was cancelled and transferred to Business US 81 on June 21, 1990.

Decatur

Business U.S. Highway 81-D (Bus. US 81-D) is the former route of US 81 and US 287 through Decatur. The route was originally designated as Loop 357 on April 30, 1962. Loop 357 was cancelled and transferred to Business US 81 on June 21, 1990.

Alvord

Business U.S. Highway 81-C (Bus. US 81-C) is the former route of US 81 and US 287 through Alvord. The route was originally designated as Loop 249 on June 16, 1980. Loop 249 was cancelled and transferred to Business US 81 on June 21, 1990. Although not officially designated as Business US 287, the route is cosigned as such from the US 81/US 287 bypass and at the junction with FM 1655.

Oklahoma

Rush Springs

The southernmost Business US-81 in Oklahoma is in the town of Rush Springs, Oklahoma. It begins south of the town, following Rush Street into the central business district. In the middle of downtown Rush Springs, there is a four way stop with Blakeley Avenue. Blakeley carries Oklahoma State Highway 17, which has its eastern terminus at Business US-81. The business route continues north on Rush Street before angling to the northwest to rejoin mainline US-81.

Business US-81 in Rush Springs is signed with a US-81 shield with a small "B" appended after the number. This method of signing business routes is unusual for Oklahoma.

Business US-81 was originally part of mainline US-81. On May 10, 1971, US-81 was relocated to run west of town, and Business US-81 was designated along the old alignment.

Kansas

McPherson

Business US-81 in Kansas is in McPherson. It begins at the intersection of I-135, US-81, and US-56 east of McPherson. At K-61, it exits east in a  "wrong-way" concurrency with K-61 before ending at I-135 and US-81 southeast of McPherson.

BUS US-81 in McPherson first appeared on the Kansas Department of Transportation Map in 1970 when Interstate 35W (now Interstate 135) was completed between McPherson and Salina.

Lindsborg

Former Business US-81 in Lindsborg began at the intersection of Interstate 135, US-81, and K-4 north of Lindsborg on an older routing of US-81. It shared a  concurrency with K-4, which turns to the west in south Lindsborg. At this junction, it went for another mile south before turning east on Smoky Valley Road, ending  later at I-135 and US-81.

The Lindsborg business loop first appeared in 1970, at the same time as the McPherson loop.

North Dakota

Fargo

Grand Forks
It starts off of I-29/US-81 at the 32nd Avenue Exit were it travels east on 32nd Avenue to Washington Street S and Follows Washington Street all the way back to I-29

References

External links

Kansas Highways Routelog

81
 
81
81
81
81